Lost Maples State Natural Area is a  area of hills and canyons on the upper Sabinal River in the Edwards Plateau Region of Texas. It is designated a Natural Area, rather than a State Park, which means the primary focus is the maintenance and protection of the property's natural state. Accordingly, access and recreational activities may be restricted if the Texas Parks & Wildlife Department (TPWD) deems such action necessary to protect the environment.

Location 
The preserve sits along the Sabinal River in western Bandera County and far eastern Real County.

History 
The land for Lost Maples State Natural Area was acquired by the state of Texas in 1973 and 1974, and was opened to the public in 1979. In 1980, the Heritage Conservation and Recreation Service made the Natural Area a National Natural Landmark.

Humans have inhabited this area since prehistoric times. The recorded history of the area, beginning with Spanish explorations in the 17th century, identifies a number of Indian groups, including the Apache, Lipan Apache and Comanche, as having foraged, hunted, and occasionally lived in this part of the Texas Hill Country.

Geology 

Much of the area's limestone bedrock is exposed on elevated terrain, which has a shallow, discontinuous cover of dark gray stony clay (Eckrant series). Most valley bottoms have deep, dark brown silty clay (Krum series) or clay loam (Pratley series). Deposits of gravel, sand, and loam (Orif-Boerne association) lie within a few hundred feet of the Sabinal River. All of these soils have free calcium carbonate throughout their profiles and are moderately alkaline. Despite a high clay content in most cases, poorly drained soils are too inextensive to be mapped.

Fauna 

As in much of the Hill Country, white-tailed deer (Odocoileus virginianus) are by far the most common large mammal on the property. Additionally, wild turkeys, armadillos, skunks, raccoons, opossums, rabbits, and fox squirrels are present. Feral pigs, exotic axis deer, porcupines, rock squirrels, and ringtails may occasionally be encountered. Bobcats, coyotes, both red and grey foxes, and rarely, mountain lions, also inhabit the general area, but are seldom seen by visitors.

Bird life, including several different raptors, is particularly abundant and diverse throughout the year. The endangered Golden-cheeked Warbler and Black-capped Vireo are endemic to the park. Venomous snakes include the broad-banded copperhead and coral snake. Western diamond-backed rattlesnake may also occur, as it has been documented nearby. The  has been documented in the park. The Texas brown tarantula is often spotted. The Sabinal River maintains surface water even during exceptional drought (as in 2011), so fish and other aquatic animals are always present.

Flora 
Primary vegetation includes the Ashe juniper (often called mountain cedar), several different species of oak, and also bigtooth maple (not a verified presence in Real County), sycamore, mesquite, Texas persimmon, Texas mountain-laurel, Texas madrone, redbud, wild grape, prickly pear, Virginia creeper and various types of brush, grasses, and ferns. Bigtooth Maple colors are brilliant if autumn is droughty, or has cold nights, but are muted in a mild, damp autumn. Texas red oak gives a fine crimson display almost every year and may retain its leaves well into winter. The Natural Area is most crowded when the fall colors peak in late October- early November. Evidence suggests that the maple trees that give the preserve its name are relics: remnants of a larger, more widespread population that flourished during the cooler and wetter climate of the last glacial period. Today, their distribution is limited by the relative rarity of the soils and microclimates they require to thrive.

A more extensive list of the preserve's fauna and flora can be found at the LMSNA Ranger Station.

Recreation 

Lost Maples is a State Natural Area and therefore has been developed only enough to provide access to visitors, while still protecting its natural character. The  reserve contains  of hiking trails, 30 campsites, and eight primitive camping areas. In the center of the park are two small lakes along Can Creek.

The Texas Parks & Wildlife Department urges all visitors to respect the Leave No Trace set of wilderness ethics... 1) Plan Ahead and Prepare, 2) Travel on Marked Trails Only, 3) Always Dispose of Waste Properly, 4) Leave Behind What You Find, 5) Never Build An Open Fire, 6) Respect All Wildlife, and 7) Be Considerate of Other Visitors. Please do your part by following this code, and protecting the park's sensitive natural and cultural resources.

References 

 Park of the Month, September 2007
 Texas Parks & Wildlife - Lost Maples State Natural Area
 Web Soil Survey (select Bandera County, Texas)
 
  City of San Antonio donates 3,000 acres to Government Canyon SNA; 732 acres to Lost Maples SNA.

External links 

 Official Texas Parks and Wildlife Site
Made in Texas ,"Lost Maples, Fly-Fishing, the WATS Line (1985)," Texas Archive of the Moving Image

State parks of Texas
Protected areas of Bandera County, Texas
Protected areas of Real County, Texas
National Natural Landmarks in Texas
Protected areas established in 1979
1979 establishments in Texas